James A. Chapman (April 3, 1881 – September 22, 1966) was a businessman closely associated with Tulsa, Oklahoma. He was nephew, son-in-law and business partner to Robert M. McFarlin.

Business career
James A. Chapman was born April 3, 1881 to Phillip and Roxana Chapman in Ellis County, Texas. He moved to Holdenville, Oklahoma in 1901. He was a co-founder of first Holdenville Oil and Gas Company, then McMan Oil Company, and finally McMan Oil and Gas Company with his uncle and father-in-law Robert M. McFarlin. The companies participated in the exploitation of the Glenn Pool and Cushing oil fields of Oklahoma in the early 20th century. The McMan Oil Company was sold to the Magnolia Petroleum Company for $39,000,000 in 1916, and the McMan Oil and Gas Company was sold to the Standard Oil (Indiana) subsidiary Dixie Oil for $20 million in 1930.

Family
Chapman married Leta McFarlin (1889–1974) in 1908, and moved to Tulsa in 1912. They had a son, H. Allen Chapman (1919–1979), who was born in Colorado in 1919.

Philanthropy
Chapman and his family used the resulting fortune to establish philanthropic trusts that fund charities in Oklahoma, Texas, and Arkansas. Funds are only distributed to the named beneficiaries of the trusts, which include institutions such as the University of Tulsa, Trinity University of San Antonio, Texas, John Brown University of Siloam Springs, Arkansas, and the Oklahoma Medical Research Foundation. According to Internal Revenue Service Form 990 filings found at GuideStar, these trusts have reported well over one billion dollars in assets in recent years.

At the time of his death, James Chapman's estate was assessed to be worth $120 million.

Chapman was also very fond of ranching and worked on the Chapman-Barnard Ranch in Osage County, Oklahoma for many years. He had long maintained that ranching, rather than business, was his first love.

In 1968, he was inducted into the Hall of Great Westerners of the National Cowboy & Western Heritage Museum.

References

University of Tulsa people
1881 births
1966 deaths
Businesspeople from Tulsa, Oklahoma
American businesspeople in the oil industry
People from Ellis County, Texas
People from Holdenville, Oklahoma
People from Osage County, Oklahoma
Philanthropists from Oklahoma
20th-century American philanthropists
Ranchers from Oklahoma
20th-century American businesspeople